Jürgen Hehlert (born 15 April 1941) is a former international speedway rider from East Germany.

Speedway career 
Hehlert was a two times champion of East Germany, winning the East German Championship in 1962 and 1966. He rode in the United Kingdom in 1974 for Hull Vikings in a challenge match.

References 

Living people
1941 births
German speedway riders